Moodle is a free and open-source learning management system written in PHP and distributed under the GNU General Public License. Moodle is used for blended learning, distance education, flipped classroom and other online learning projects in schools, universities, workplaces and other sectors.

Moodle is used to create custom websites with online courses and allows for community-sourced plugins.

Overview 

Moodle was originally developed by Martin Dougiamas with the goal of helping educators create online courses and a focus on interaction and collaborative construction of content.

The Moodle Project is led and coordinated by Moodle HQ, an Australian company, that is financially supported by a network of eighty-four Moodle Partner service companies worldwide. Development is also assisted by the open-source community.

Moodle is a learning platform used to augment and move existing learning environments online. As an E-learning tool, Moodle developed a number of features now considered standard for learning management systems, such as a calendar and gradebook.

Plugins, custom graphical themes, mobile responsive web design, and a Moodle mobile app are available to customize each individual's experience on the platform. Moodle's mobile app is available on Google Play, App Store (iOS), F-Droid (Android FLOSS repository), and the Windows Phone Store.

E-learning standards support 

Moodle has adopted the following e-learning standards:
 Sharable Content Object Reference Model (SCORM) is a collection of E-learning standards and specifications that define communications between client side content and a server side learning management system, as well as how externally authored content should be packaged in order to integrate with the LMS effectively. There are two versions: SCORM 1.2 and SCORM 2004. Moodle is SCORM 1.2 compliant, and passes all the tests in the ADL Conformance test suite 1.2.7 for SCORM 1.2. SCORM 2004 is not supported in Moodle, however Rustici Software have a Moodle plugin which can turn any Moodle site into a fully compliant SCORM 2004 LMS.
 The AICC HACP standard for CMI was developed by the Aviation Industry Computer-Based Training Committee (AICC) and is used to call externally authored content and assessment packages. AICC content packages are supported in Moodle 2.1 and later versions.
 IMS Common Cartridge packages can also be imported into Moodle. In addition, Moodle Book activities can be exported as IMS Content Packages.
 Learning Tools Interoperability (LTI) is a standard way of integrating rich learning applications (often remotely hosted and provided through third-party services) with educational platforms. Moodle uses the External Tool activity to act as an 'LTI consumer' as standard, and will act as an 'LTI provider' using a plugin.

Deployment 

Users can download and install Moodle on a Web server, such as the Apache HTTP Server, and a number of database management systems, such as MySQL, are supported. Pre-built combinations of Moodle with a Web server and database are available for Microsoft Windows and Mac. Other automated installation approaches exist, such as installing  a Debian package, deploying a ready-to-use TurnKey Moodle appliance, using the Bitnami installer, or using a "one-click install" service such as Installatron.

Certified Moodle Partners provide other Moodle services, including hosting, training, customization and content development. This network of providers support development of the Moodle project through royalties.

Interoperability

Moodle runs without modification on Unix, Linux, FreeBSD, Windows, MacOS, NetWare and any other systems that support PHP and a database, including webhost providers.

Moodle also has import features for use with other specific systems, such as importing quizzes or entire courses from Blackboard or WebCT. , Moodle did not import Blackboard courses, apparently due to changes in php code-releases.

In March 2012 Blackboard acquired two companies based on Moodle's software including Baltimore-based Moodlerooms Inc. and NetSpot of Adelaide, Australia. In August 2015, Blackboard acquired Colombia-based Nivel7, possibly the largest Moodle services provider in Latin America. The Red Hat site, Opensource.com, reported that Moodle will always be an open-source project, with clear delineation between Blackboard and Moodle.

Background

Origins 
Martin Dougiamas, who has graduate degrees in computer science and education, wrote the first version of Moodle. Dougiamas started a Ph.D. to examine "the use of open source software to support a social constructionist epistemology of teaching and learning within Internet-based communities of reflective inquiry." Although how exactly social constructivism makes Moodle different from other eLearning platforms is difficult to show, it has been cited as an important factor by Moodle adopters. Other Moodle adopters, such as the Open University in the UK, have pointed out that Learning Management Systems can equally be seen as "relatively pedagogy-neutral".

Pedagogical approach 
The stated philosophy of Moodle includes a constructivist and social constructionist approach to education, emphasizing that learners (and not just teachers) can contribute to the educational experience. Using these pedagogical principles, Moodle provides an environment for learning communities.

Origin of name 
The acronym Moodle officially stands for modular object-oriented dynamic learning environment. When the project was first started, the "m" instead stood for "Martin's", after original developer Martin Dougiamas. Besides being an acronym, the name was also chosen because of the dictionary definition of Moodle, with connotations such as "tinkering", "insight", and "creativity", as well as to correspond to an available domain name.

Development 
Moodle has continued to evolve since 1999 (since 2001 with the current architecture). It has been translated into over 100 different languages and is accessible in many countries worldwide. Institutions can add as many Moodle servers as needed without having to pay license fees. The Open University of the UK currently uses a Moodle installation for their 200,000 users while the UK government uses a Moodle installation for their Civil Service Learning platform serving half a million employees.

Releases

Moodle conferences 
The MoodleMoot is a conference for Moodle community members to learn about Moodle, share experiences of the learning platform, discuss research in related educational technologies and contribute ideas to future Moodle development. Held around the world, MoodleMoots are organised by universities or other large organizations using Moodle, Moodle Partners, Moodle associations or Moodle HQ. 2020 saw the #Moot move to a virtual conference.

Adoption
Moodle has over 50% of market share in Europe, Latin America, and Oceania.

In the U.S. higher education market as of fall 2018, the top three learning management systems (LMS) by number of institutions were Blackboard (31%), Canvas (30%), and Moodle (18%). --- In 2013, Moodle was for a time the second largest provider with 23% market share, following Blackboard (41%). However, by 2017, Moodle had dropped to the third largest provider, due in part to increased adoption of Instructure's semi-open source Canvas platform. In March 2016, Blackboard became an official Moodle partner, although this partnership ended in 2018.

See also 

 Educational technology
 Student Information System
 Learning management system
 Online learning community
 List of learning management systems
 List of free and open-source software packages

References

External links

 
 Moodle and WhatsApp Integration Plugin
 Cloud based, subscription model of Moodle

Classroom management software
Cross-platform software
Free content management systems
Free educational software
Free learning management systems
Free learning support software
Free software programmed in PHP
Learning management systems
Virtual learning environments
Software using the GPL license